David Streitfeld is a Pulitzer Prize–winning American journalist, best known for his reporting on books and technology. During his tenure as book reporter at The Washington Post, he definitively identified Joe Klein as the "Anonymous" author of the 1996 novel Primary Colors, upon which Klein admitted authorship, despite earlier denials.

Career
During his career, Streitfeld wrote for The Washington Post, the Los Angeles Times, and is currently a technology reporter for the New York Times. Since 1999, he has reported from San Francisco.

Washington Post
At The Washington Post, Streitfeld covered books and publishing between 1987 and 1998; for three more years, he covered Silicon Valley and technology for the Post from San Francisco. In 1997, Streitfeld identified Joe Klein as Anonymous, the author of the bestselling book about the Clinton presidential campaign, Primary Colors. Streitfeld, a book collector, spotted a galley proof, a pre-publication version of the novel, listed for sale in an antiquarian booksellers catalog. The proof reproduced handwritten changes, which Streitfeld sent to a handwriting expert, who compared the notes to Joe Klein's handwriting, confirming that he was the author.

Streitfeld has reported extensively on Amazon's business practices, dating back to the 1990s, when the company was primarily an online bookstore. In 1998, Streitfeld gave Jeff Bezos, the founder of Amazon, his first tour of the Washington Post, which Bezos purchased in 2013. "The editors there thought Amazon was cute, interesting, a frill — not something transformative. The notion that the Post would one day be owned by the guy with the goofy laugh sitting in front of them was literally inconceivable.”

Los Angeles Times
In 2001, Streitfeld joined the Los Angeles Times as a technology reporter, later switching to covering Enron, housing, and general economics. In July 2006, the Atlantic magazine named him "The Bard of the Bubble" for his LA Times real estate coverage.

New York Times
In 2007, Streitfeld joined The New York Times as Chicago business reporter and later covered technology subjects.

Streitfeld was one of a team of New York Times reporters who won the 2013 Pulitzer Prize for Explanatory Reporting for a series of 10 articles on the business practices of Apple and other technology companies. Streitfeld's contribution focused on freelance programmers and how hard it could be to make a living making apps for the iPhone.

In May 2014, Streitfeld broke the story of Amazon.com's negotiating tactics with publishing house Hachette, which he continued to cover for multiple months. The reporting on the topic by The New York Times and Streitfeld was the subject of a piece by The New York Times Public Editor Margaret Sullivan in October 2014.

In January 2015, Melville House published Gabriel Garcia Marquez: The Last Interview, a collection edited by Streitfeld. The introduction details his friendship with Marquez and the circumstances of their talks on two continents.

In August 2015, Streitfeld and New York Times colleague Jodi Kantor co-authored Inside Amazon: Wrestling Big Ideas in a Bruising Workplace. The 6000-word story generated more than 6600 comments, the largest number of comments on a story in The New York Times history and the Times story reporting this fact drew over 200 comments.

Since 2015, Streitfeld has edited books in the "Last Interview" series for Melville House. The books collect interviews with authors. He has edited collections by Gabriel García Márquez, Philip K. Dick, Ursula Le Guin, Hunter S. Thompson, and David Foster Wallace. Maureen Corrigan gave a favorable review to the Philip K. Dick collection on NPR's Fresh Air.

Streitfeld is currently working on a book about the Texas writer Larry McMurtry to be published by Mariner Books.

Popular culture
Streitfeld's longtime friendship with science fiction author Elizabeth Hand inspired her Nebula Award-winning short story Echo.

Awards
 2012 "Best in Business" award from the Society of American Business Editors and Writers for his The New York Times stories on fake online reviews. Judges cited "a really nice job detailing this new review economy and how these reviews are replacing traditional advertising."
 2013 Pulitzer Prize for Explanatory Reporting as part of a team reporting on the tech industry </ref></ref>. Streitfeld's contribution was "As Boom Lures App Creators, Tough Part Is Making a Living", published on November 17, 2012.
 2017 William Randolph Hearst Foundation Professional Award for Excellence presented by San Jose State University’s School of Journalism and Mass Communications.

Personal life
Streitfeld is married and has a daughter. He lives near San Francisco, California, with a book collection exceeding 10,000 volumes. As a tech reporter, Streitfeld is reported to not use much technology outside of his job.

Books
 Gabriel García Márquez: The Last Interview (as editor). Melville House (2015) . A collection of interviews with the Nobel Prize-winning author, including two by Streitfeld.
 Philip K. Dick: The Last Interview and Other Conversations (as editor). Melville House (2015) . A collection of interviews with the science fiction author, including the first one ever published and one conducted the day before his fatal stroke.
 J. D. Salinger: The Last Interview and Other Conversations (as editor). Melville House (2016) . 
 Hunter S. Thompson: The Last Interview and Other Conversations (as editor). Melville House (2018) .
 David Foster Wallace: The Last Interview and Other Conversations (as editor). Melville House (2018) . An expanded edition, with a new introduction by Streitfeld.
 Ursula K. Le Guin: The Last Interview (as editor). Melville House (2019) . 
 Western Star: Larry McMurtry, Lonesome Dove, and the Making of an American Myth (forthcoming). Mariner Books.

References

External links
Column archive at The New York Times

American male journalists
Living people
Pulitzer Prize for Explanatory Journalism winners
Year of birth missing (living people)